Charleston metropolitan area may refer to:

 Charleston, Illinois micropolitan area, United States
 Charleston, South Carolina metropolitan area, United States
 Charleston, West Virginia metropolitan area, United States

See also
Charleston (disambiguation)